Mangelia perrisi is a minute extinct species of sea snail, a marine gastropod mollusk in the family Mangeliidae.

Description
The length of the shell attains 30 mm.

Distribution
This extinct marine species was found in the Middle Miocene strata of Aquitaine, France.

References

External links
 Worldwide Mollusc Species Data Base: Mangelia perrisi

perrisi
Gastropods described in 1931